Ustupo is a town in the Kuna Yala province of Panama.

Ustupo Airport runway 15/33 bridges between two of the islands. Another runway is onshore.

Sources 

World Gazetteer: Panama – World-Gazetteer.com
Google Earth

External links

Populated places in Guna Yala